SM3, Sm3, sM3, sm3 or SM-3 may refer to:

Spider-Man 3, the third Spider-Man film released in 2007
Superman III, the third Superman film released in 1983
 Renault Samsung SM3, a car model made by Renault Samsung
 VR Class Sm3, a type of train operated by the VR Group
 SM3 postcode area, the Sutton postcode area covering North Cheam
 RIM-161 Standard Missile 3, a naval launched anti-ballistic missile used by the US Navy
 SM3 (hash function), a cryptographic hash function of Chinese national standard
 Standard cubic meter (Sm3), an industrial unit measuring the amount of a gas
 Shawn Mendes (album) or SM3, the third album by the Canadian singer Shawn Mendes